Russian duo t.A.T.u. have released six studio albums, one compilation album, two remix albums, eighteen singles, and three promotional singles. t.A.t.u. debuted in 2000 with the single "Ya Soshla S Uma" from their debut album 200 Po Vstrechnoy, released in 2001 by Universal Music Russia. The album reached number one in the Czech Republic, Poland, and Slovakia. After selling 850,000 copies in Russia, it was certified platinum by the IFPI for more than one million copies in Europe, the first time for an Eastern European act. The album's English-language counterpart, 200 km/h in the Wrong Lane, was released worldwide through Interscope Records in 2002. It reached number thirteen on the US Billboard 200 and was certified gold by the RIAA. In Japan, the album reached number one, the first time for a foreign group, and sold 1.8 million copies. It was also certified platinum by the IFPI for more than one million copies sold in Europe. 200 km/h in the Wrong Lane was promoted with the duo's first international single "All the Things She Said", which topped the charts in Australia, Ireland, New Zealand, and the United Kingdom while peaking at number twenty on the Billboard Hot 100. The album produced three more singles—"Not Gonna Get Us", "30 Minutes", and "How Soon Is Now?"—, with the former becoming t.A.T.u.'s second top 10 single in Ireland and the United Kingdom. Ultimately, 200 km/h in the Wrong Lane became the twelfth best-selling album of 2003, and sold over 5 million copies worldwide. A remix album titled Remixes was released in 2003 and certified gold in Russia.

t.A.T.u.'s third and fourth studio albums, Dangerous and Moving and Lyudi Invalidy, respectively, were released in 2005. Dangerous and Moving achieved its best placing in Taiwan, where it peaked at number four. It reached the top 10 in Mexico, where it was certified gold, and Japan, as well as the top 20 in Germany and Italy. Its first single, "All About Us", reached number five on Russia's TopHit chart and the top 10 in several European countries, including the United Kingdom. "All About Us" also reached the top 40 in Australia, Ireland, and Japan. Two more singles from Dangerous and Moving, "Friend or Foe" and "Gomenasai", achieved popularity in Europe. Lyudi Invalidy was certified platinum in Russia. The duo released their greatest hits album The Best in 2006 after parting ways with Universal Music. The single "Loves Me Not" was selected to promote the album and reached the top 40 in Russia and Slovakia.

t.A.T.u.'s fifth studio album Vesyolye Ulybki was released in 2008. It spawned three singles—"Beliy Plaschik", "220", and "You and I"—, all of which charted in the Russian top 100. The album's English-language counterpart Waste Management followed in 2009. The duo released the remix album Waste Management Remixes before splitting in 2011. With 8 million records sold worldwide, t.A.T.u. rank among the best-selling girl groups.

Albums

Studio albums

Compilation albums

Singles

Promotional singles

Videography

Music videos

Video albums

Footnotes

References

Discography
Discographies of Russian artists
Pop music group discographies